The 71st Mixed Brigade was a unit of the Spanish Republican Army that participated in the Spanish Civil War, deployed on the Guadalajara front.

History 
The unit was born in January 1937 from the militarization of the "Espartaco", "Apoyo" or "Alicante Rojo" militia battalions, constituting in its place the 71st Mixed Brigade. The unit was placed in the 12th Division and sent to the Torija sector on the Guadalajara front. At the beginning of March, after the CTV attack in this area, the 71st Mixed Brigade fully intervened in the battle of Guadalajara. Before the enemy push, on March 8 the "Alicante Rojo" battalion had to withdraw up to km. 103 of highway N-II. During those battles, the brigade suffered serious losses - the 281st and 282nd battalions added more than 600 casualties.

After the fighting the unit was withdrawn to Madrid to undergo a reorganization. It was briefly attached to the 11th and 17th divisions, although it eventually returned to the 12th Division. The 71st Mixed Brigade remained for the rest of the war at the Guadalajara front, dissolving itself on March 27, 1939.

Publications 
The brigade edited a publication, "Alicante Rojo", directed by Juan Francisco Alted.

Command 
 Commanders
 Infantry Commander Eduardo Rubio Funes;

 Commissars
 Antonio Barea Arenas, of the CNT;
 Carlos Codes Guerra;

Chief of Staff
 Militia Captain José M. Navarro Abad;

Notes

References

Bibliography 
  
 
 
 
 
 

Military units and formations established in 1937
Military units and formations disestablished in 1939
Mixed Brigades (Spain)
Militarized anarchist formations
Military units and formations of the Spanish Civil War
Military history of Spain
Armed Forces of the Second Spanish Republic